Jestin or Jestina is a given name, a variant of Justin, and may refer to:

 Jestin Coler, founder of Disinfomedia
 Jestin George (born 1998), Indian professional footballer
 Jestina Mukoko, Zimbabwean human rights activist 
 Justinian of Ramsey Island, 6th-century hermit

See also
 Jestyn (disambiguation)